Luuk Admiraal (born  15 March 2002) is a Dutch footballer who plays as a forward for SV Spakenburg on loan from Excelsior Rotterdam.

Career

ASWH 
Admiraal played in the youth of ASWH. He made his debut in the first squad on 18 January 2020 against SV Spakenburg in the Tweede Divisie, still 17 years old. In 2021, Admiraal turned down a move to ADO Den Haag for fear of his growth being stunted without regular first-team football. He was subsequently awarded the ‘Gouden Bal’ (Golden Ball) award for the best player in the Tweede Divisie in 2021, despite ASWH battling relegation. He was ASWH's top scorer at this time.

Excelsior and Spakenburg 
Admiraal signed for Excelsior Rotterdam in January 2022, signing for a year. Admiraal played his first minutes for Excelsior in the promotion play-off on 29 May 2022 against ADO Den Haag, appearing as a substitute. After extra time, the match ended 4–4 and went to penalty kicks. Admiraal scored the seventh spot-kick for his new side who ultimately won the shoot-out 8–7 on sudden death, and secured promotion. Admiraal made his Eredivisie debut for Excelsior appearing as a substitute in a 3–1 victory for Excelsior against Vitesse on 12 August 2022.

On 29 August 2022, Admiraal joined SV Spakenburg in the Tweede Divisie on loan for the season.

References

External links
 

Living people
2002 births
Dutch footballers
Footballers from Zwijndrecht, Netherlands
Association football forwards
Eredivisie players
Tweede Divisie players
ASWH players
Excelsior Rotterdam players
SV Spakenburg players